is the seventh studio album by Japanese pop band Pizzicato Five. It was released on June 1, 1993 by the Nippon Columbia imprint Triad. The band co-produced the album with acquaintance and fellow Shibuya-kei artist Cornelius. Following the house music-oriented Sweet Pizzicato Five the previous year, Bossa Nova 2001 signaled a return to the band's 1960s and 1970s-influenced pop style, mixed with elements of alternative dance.

Bossa Nova 2001 is the last Pizzicato Five studio album to feature guitarist Keitarō Takanami, who quit the band in 1994. Several of the album's tracks were later featured on the band's Matador Records compilations Made in USA (1994) and The Sound of Music by Pizzicato Five (1995). Bossa Nova 2001 was reissued by Readymade Records on September 30, 2000 and March 31, 2006.

Track listing

Charts

References

External links
 

1993 albums
Pizzicato Five albums
Nippon Columbia albums
Japanese-language albums